In baseball, a home run is scored when the ball is hit so far that the batter is able to circle all the bases ending at home plate, scoring himself plus any runners already on base, with no errors by the defensive team on the play. An automatic home run is achieved by hitting the ball on the fly over the outfield fence in fair territory.  More rarely, an inside-the-park home run occurs when the hitter reaches home plate while the baseball remains in play on the field. In Major League Baseball (MLB), a player in each league wins the home run title each season by hitting the most home runs that year. Only home runs hit in a particular league count towards that league's seasonal lead. Mark McGwire, for example, hit 58 home runs in 1997, more than any other player that year. However, McGwire was traded from the American League's (AL) Oakland Athletics to the National League's (NL) St. Louis Cardinals midway through the season and his individual AL and NL home run totals (34 and 24, respectively) did not qualify to lead either league.

The first home run champion in the National League was George Hall. In the league's inaugural 1876 season, Hall hit five home runs for the short-lived National League Philadelphia Athletics. In 1901, the American League was established and Hall of Fame second baseman Nap Lajoie led it with 14 home runs for the American League Philadelphia Athletics. Over the course of his 22-season career, Babe Ruth led the American League in home runs twelve times. Mike Schmidt and Ralph Kiner have the second and third most home run titles respectively, Schmidt with eight and Kiner with seven, all won in the National League. Kiner's seven consecutive titles from 1946 to 1952 are also the most consecutive home run titles by any player.

Ruth set the Major League Baseball single-season home run record four times, first at 29 (1919), then 54 (1920), 59 (1921), and finally 60 (1927). Ruth's 1920 and 1921 seasons are tied for the widest margin of victory for a home run champion as he topped the next highest total by 35 home runs in each season. The single season mark of 60 stood for 34 years until Roger Maris hit 61 home runs in 1961 for which MLB assigned an asterisk until reversing themselves in 1991 citing Maris had accomplished his record in a longer season. Maris' mark was broken 37 years later by both Mark McGwire and Sammy Sosa during the 1998 home run record chase, with McGwire ultimately setting a new record of 70. Barry Bonds, who also has the most career home runs, then broke that mark, setting the current single season record of 73 in 2001. Of the four players to break Maris' record, one (McGwire) has since admitted to the use of performance-enhancing substances during his playing career and two others (Sosa and Bonds) are both widely suspected to have used such substances as well. The 1998 and 2001 seasons each had four players hit 50 or more home runs – Greg Vaughn, Ken Griffey Jr., Sosa, and McGwire in 1998 and Alex Rodriguez, Luis Gonzalez, Sosa, and Bonds in 2001. A player has hit 50 or more home runs 42 times, 25 times since 1990. The lowest home run total to lead a major league was four, recorded in the NL by Lip Pike in 1877 and Paul Hines in 1878.

On October 4, 2022 Aaron Judge hit his 62nd homerun of the year off Jesús Tinoco of the Texas Rangers passing Roger Maris for the AL home run record 61 years after Maris set it and making him only the sixth person to hit at least 60.

Key

American League

National League

Other major leagues

See also

Babe Ruth Home Run Award (discontinued) – awarded to the MLB home-run leader
Josh Gibson Legacy Award – awarded to the AL and NL home-run leaders
Mel Ott Award – awarded to the NL home-run leader
61* - film depicting Maris' record setting 61 home runs in 1961

Footnotes
Recognized "major leagues" include the current American and National Leagues and several defunct leagues – the American Association, the Federal League, the Players' League, and the Union Association.

References
General

Specific

Home run champions
Major League Baseball records
Home run